Mengejar Mas-Mas is a 2007 Indonesian comedy drama film  directed by Rudy Soedjarwo and written by Monty Tiwa.

Synopsis
Mengejar Mas-Mas is an Indonesia drama comedy movie. Shanaz (Poppy Sovia) felt guilty for her father's death. Her relationship with her mother disharmonize, and things get worse when her mother decides to marry her boyfriend within 8 months since her father died. Disappointed, Shanaz runs away to Jogjakarta to follow her boyfriend Mika, but she lost contact with him. With no money, she has been strayed to Pasar Kembang (Sarkem), the worst localization in Jogjakarta. She meets Ningsih (Dina Olivia), a prostitute who saves her from a bad guy. Ningsih lets Shanaz stays with her, and they get close. Then Shanaz meet Parno (Dwi Sasono), Ningsih's former boyfriend. They often spend their time together during Ningsih absence for "work". Even he is 20 years older than Shanaz, Parno's crushed to Shanaz's heart. Shanaz secretly falls in love with him, but Ningsih and Parno still care for each other.

Cast
Dina Olivia
Poppy Sovia
Dwi Sasono
Roy Marten
Ira Wibowo

External links
 Mengejar Mas-Mas at The Best Movie Review

2007 films
2000s Indonesian-language films
2007 comedy-drama films
Films shot in Indonesia
2007 comedy films
2007 drama films
Indonesian comedy-drama films
Films directed by Rudy Soedjarwo